History 101 is a common name for an introductory history course.

History 101 may also refer to:

 History 101 (novel), a 2002 Doctor Who novel
 "History 101" (Community), a 2013 episode of NBC television series Community
 History 101 (TV series), a 2020 Netflix documentary programme

See also 

 History of the 101st Airborne Division
 Outline of history
 wikiversity:School:History, a basic course in history